The men's freestyle featherweight was a Catch as Catch Can wrestling, later freestyle, event held as part of the wrestling at the 1920 Summer Olympics programme. It was the third appearance of the event. Featherweight was the lightest category, and included wrestlers weighing up to 54 kilograms.

A total of ten wrestlers from seven nations competed in the event, which was held from Wednesday, August 25 to Friday, August 27, 1920.

Results

References

External links
 
 
 

Wrestling at the 1920 Summer Olympics